Cody Patrick James Prior (born 28 October 1999) is an Irish professional footballer who is a free agent, last playing as a midfielder for League One club Doncaster Rovers.

Career
He made his debut for debut for Doncaster Rovers on 3 October 2017, in the Football League Trophy. He turned professional in June 2018.

Prior joined Nuneaton Borough on loan on 19 January 2019 for a month, making 3 appearances. On returning to Doncaster it was announced that Prior had signed a contract extension, keeping him at the club until the summer of 2020. In August 2019 he moved on loan to Frickley Athletic, and the following month to Sheffield.

He was released by Doncaster on 31 January 2020.

References

External links

1999 births
Living people
Republic of Ireland association footballers
Doncaster Rovers F.C. players
Nuneaton Borough F.C. players
Frickley Athletic F.C. players
Sheffield F.C. players
Association football midfielders
Republic of Ireland expatriate association footballers
Irish expatriate sportspeople in England
Expatriate footballers in England